Jeannette Escanilla Diaz (born 1961) is a Swedish politician and former member of the Riksdag, the national legislature. A member of the Left Party, she represented Uppsala County between June 2018 and September 2018.

Escanilla was president of the Ship to Gaza foundation. She was part of the Women's Boat to Gaza crew aboard the Zaytouna-Olivia that tried to break the Israeli naval blockade of the Gaza Strip in October 2016 but were intercepted by the Israelis in international waters and taken to Ashdod in Israel before being deported.

References

1961 births
21st-century Swedish women politicians
Living people
Members of the Riksdag 2014–2018
Members of the Riksdag from the Left Party (Sweden)
Women members of the Riksdag